Dentimargo yucatecana is a species of sea snail, a marine gastropod mollusk in the family Marginellidae, the margin snails.

Description

Distribution

References

 Cossignani T. (2006). Marginellidae & Cystiscidae of the World. L'Informatore Piceno. 408pp

External links
 Dall, W. H. (1881). Reports on the results of dredging, under the supervision of Alexander Agassiz, in the Gulf of Mexico and in the Caribbean Sea (1877-78), by the United States Coast Survey Steamer "Blake", Lieutenant-Commander C.D. Sigsbee, U.S.N., and Commander J.R. Bartlett, U.S.N., commanding. XV. Preliminary report on the Mollusca. Bulletin of the Museum of Comparative Zoölogy at Harvard College. 9(2): 33-144

Marginellidae
Gastropods described in 1881